Taoufik Djemail (born 30 May 1948) is a Tunisian handball player. He competed in the men's tournament at the 1972 Summer Olympics.

References

1948 births
Living people
Tunisian male handball players
Olympic handball players of Tunisia
Handball players at the 1972 Summer Olympics
Place of birth missing (living people)